The Our Lady of the Immaculate Conception Cathedral  also called Leiria Cathedral It is a Catholic church built in the center of the city of Leiria, Portugal.

The church was built between 1550 and 1574, according to a project by architect Afonso Alvares. The city had been elevated to a diocese in 1545, thanks to a request of John III to Pope Paul III. Because the churches of Nossa Senhora da Pena and San Pedro were too small for the population, building a new one is needed suitable for the new church dignity. The first stone was laid on August 1, 1550, becoming one of the most important buildings of the late Renaissance in Portugal.

The building was later altered successive stages, according to the taste of the bishops of the diocese. The cathedral was partially destroyed in the 1755 Lisbon earthquake, so reforms that gave the current robust appearance were made. Of the original construction, the front facade, just 3 remaining panels at the entrance, two of which correspond to the central or higher. The building was also damaged during the Peninsular War in 1811, French troops set fire, destroying much of its interior decoration.

See also
Roman Catholicism in Portugal
Our Lady of the Immaculate Conception

References

Leiria
Buildings and structures in Leiria
Roman Catholic churches completed in 1574
National monuments in Leiria District
16th-century Roman Catholic church buildings in Portugal